Diocese of Skopje may refer to:

 Roman Catholic Diocese of Skopje, current diocese of Catholic Church in North Macedonia
 Roman Catholic Diocese of Skopje and Prizren, former diocese (1969-2000) of Catholic Church
 Metropolitan Diocese of Skopje, an Eastern Orthodox eparchy of the Orthodox Ohrid Archbishopric (Serbian Orthodox Church)
 Macedonian Orthodox Diocese of Skopje, part of Macedonian Orthodox Church – Ohrid Archbishopric
 Bulgarian Orthodox Diocese of Skopje, former eparchy of the Bulgarian Exarchate

See also
 Catholic Church in North Macedonia
 Eastern Orthodoxy in North Macedonia
 Diocese of Prizren (disambiguation)